Nemophas tomentosus is a species of beetle in the family Cerambycidae. It was described by Buquet in 1859, originally under the genus Apriona. It is known from the Solomon Islands and Papua New Guinea.

References

tomentosus
Beetles described in 1859